The DLF Cup (named after sponsor DLF) was the name for two one-day internationals between India and Pakistan to be held in United Arab Emirates in April. The revenue of the friendship cup matches went to help the victims of the 2005 Kashmir earthquake. The DLF Cup also signifies the return of cricket to the Middle East after a 6-year absence.

Schedule

Squads

ODI Series

1st ODI

2nd ODI

Notes

International cricket competitions in 2005–06